This Strange Place is a project album featuring members of Celtic rock band Wolfstone. Originally released in 1997 under the name and artist credit of  Drever-Mackenzie, it was soon erroneously reissued as a Wolfstone recording with the new title This Strange Place, perhaps, it has been suggested, as a contract filler.

Background
Wolfstone's The Half Tail was released in 1996 to success. Following this, Ivan Drever worked on a side-project involving some of Wolfstone's line-up, but primarily with bassist Wayne Mackenzie. The project, entitled "This Strange Place", resulted in a ten-track album recorded for Green Linnet records. Green Linnet, however, ultimately released the album as a Wolfstone recording, and so the band's popularity waned as fans were led to believe that Drever's mellow style was the new direction Wolfstone were taking. Drever later left the band before the release of Seven in 1999. Drever and Duncan Chisholm released The Lewis Blue in 1998 which was noted, musically, as being closer to being a Wolfstone album than This Strange Place.

Track listing
"Harlequin" - 3:57
The Harlequin
Pipe Major Stevie Saint
"This Girl" - 4:23
"Let Them Sing" - 3:18
"Banks of the Ness" - 4:14
"This Strange Place" - 4:02
"Stevie's Set" - 3:54
The Wild Monkey Dance
Black Eyed Jam
"Till I Sleep" - 4:22
"The Arab Set" - 3:49
An Arab in the Court of Kintail
The Redwood Reel
"Reluctant Journey" - 4:40
"Kazakhstan" - 5:15
A Thief in the Night
The Hills of Kazakhstan

Wolfstone albums
1998 albums